Events from the year 1513 in art.

Events
Albrecht Altdorfer appointed to the service of Maximilian I in Innsbruck, where he receives several commissions from the imperial court

Works

 Fra Bartolomeo – SS Peter and Paul (Pinacoteca Vaticana)
 Cima da Conegliano : Saints Roch, Anthony Abbot and Lucy (Metropolitan Museum of Art)
 Albrecht Dürer – Knight, Death and the Devil (engraving)
 Leonardo da Vinci – Old Man with Water Studies (drawing)
 Quentin Matsys – approximate dates
Madonna and Child with the Lamb
A Portrait of an Elderly Man
The Ugly Duchess
 Palma Vecchio - Assumption of the Virgin (Gallerie dell'Accademia)

Births
 Pierre Reymond, French enamelist (died 1584)
 Approximate date – Pirro Ligorio, Italian architect and painter (died 1583)

Deaths 
 Michel Colombe, French sculptor (born 1430)
 Pieter van Coninxloo, Early Netherlandish painter (born 1460)
 Bastiano Mainardi, Italian painter (born 1466)
 Agnolo di Domenico del Mazziere - Italian painter and draughtsman of Renaissance art (born 1466)
 Pinturicchio, Italian painter of the Renaissance (born 1454)
 Francesco Rosselli, Italian miniature painter, engraver of maps and old master prints (born 1445)

 
Years of the 16th century in art